Ojus is a census-designated place and formerly incorporated town in Miami-Dade County, Florida, United States. The population was 19,673 at the 2020 census, up from 18,036 in 2010.

History
People have been living in the Ojus area for thousands of years. Paleo-Indians have been documented in south Florida dating back to over 13,000 years ago. Archaeologists have uncovered ancient sites at Arch Creek and along the Oleta River. According to archaeologist Robert Carr, although the largest Tequesta settlement was located at the mouth of the Miami River, by 750 BCE approximately 100 Native Americans routinely inhabited the local area which was just a one-hour canoe trip north of the main settlement. The Oleta River, which cuts through Ojus, was one of the Tequesta's primary "roadways" for millennia.  Subsequent people, to include Seminoles, European explorers, and early settlers, would also use the Oleta River to traverse from Miami to the New River in Ft. Lauderdale.

During the late nineteenth century, settlers established farms along the Oleta River. These settlers grew peas, beans, sugar cane, and tomatoes. Seminoles set up a trading post near present-day Greynolds Park to conduct business with the Ojus settlers. In 1897, Albert Fitch named the area "Ojus" after the Seminole word for "plenty" or "lots of".  After the turn of the century, rock was discovered in the area that was ideal for road building. Many of the neighborhood lakes were created during the early part of the twentieth century to support construction of the area's infrastructure.

State representative Graham W. King lived in Ojus.

Two landmarks were created in the early part of the twentieth century, but only one survives. In 1925, Carl Fischer constructed the Fulford–Miami Speedway in the present-day Sky Lake neighborhood. The wooden race track was then billed as the world's fastest. It was unfortunately destroyed by the devastating 1926 hurricane. One of the region's most notable features, Greynolds Park, was established in 1936 as part of President Franklin Roosevelt's Civilian Conservation Corps (CCC) "New Deal" programs. The park was named after Mr. A.O. Greynolds, owner of the Ojus Rock Company, who donated  of his property in exchange for naming the park after him. Over the years, the park has expanded to include a golf course and a boathouse, and even hosted popular musical acts during the 1960s such as the Grateful Dead. Greynolds Park was declared a historic site in 1983.

Geography
Its northern boundary is the Broward County line. Ojus is bordered in Miami-Dade County by Aventura to the east, North Miami Beach to the south, and Ives Estates to the west, while neighboring Broward County communities are Pembroke Park to the northwest and Hallandale Beach to the north.

Interstate 95 forms the western border of the community and provides access via Exit 16 (Ives Dairy Road). U.S. Route 1 (Biscayne Boulevard) runs parallel to the eastern border, just inside the Aventura city limits.

The Oleta River drains the east side of the community.

It is in the Eastern Standard Time Zone.

Surrounding areas
 Hallandale Beach
 Aventura
 North Miami Beach
 Ives Estates

Demographics

2020 census

As of the 2020 United States census, there were 19,673 people, 6,589 households, and 4,010 families residing in the CDP.

2000 census
As of the census of 2000, there were 16,642 people, 7,089 households, and 4,345 families residing in the CDP. The racial makeup of the CDP was 85.09% White (of which 59.5% were Non-Hispanic White,) 7.05% African American, 0.13% Native American, 1.74% Asian, 0.04% Pacific Islander, 3.08% from other races, and 2.86% from two or more races. Hispanic or Latino of any race were 30.60% of the population.

There were 7,089 households, out of which 27.6% had children under the age of 18 living with them, 46.2% were married couples living together, 11.3% had a female householder with no husband present, and 38.7% were non-families. Of all households, 33.1% were made up of individuals, and 16.5% had someone living alone who was 65 years of age or older.  The average household size was 2.33 and the average family size was 2.98.

In the CDP, the population was spread out, with 21.5% under the age of 18, 6.4% from 18 to 24, 26.9% from 25 to 44, 25.6% from 45 to 64, and 19.5% who were 65 years of age or older.  The median age was 42 years. For every 100 females, there were 87.3 males.  For every 100 females age 18 and over, there were 83.0 males.

The median income for a household in the CDP was $33,294, and the median income for a family was $41,693. Males had a median income of $34,773 versus $28,781 for females. The per capita income for the CDP was $25,392.  About 11.1% of families and 13.5% of the population were below the poverty line, including 14.2% of those under age 18 and 15.8% of those age 65 or over.

As of 2000, speakers of English as a first language accounted for 47.42% of residents, while Spanish made up 32.70%, Russian was at 3.35%, Yiddish was at 2.96%, Hebrew at 2.92%, and the mother tongue of French Creole was 2.41% of the population's speakers. Both Portuguese and French tied with 2.11% of the populace. Arabic made up 0.74% of speakers, while both Chinese and German were spoken by 0.55% of all residents. Also, both Greek and Hungarian were a mother tongue of 0.52% of the population.

As of 2000, Ojus had the fifty-sixth-highest percentage of Cuban residents in the US, with 6.77% of the populace. It had the thirty-fifth-highest percentage of Colombian residents in the US, at 3.71% of the population, and the fifty-first-highest percentage of Haitian residents in the US, at 3.0% of its population (tied with Avon Park, Fla. and Haines City, Fla.) It also had the nineteenth-most Peruvians in the US, at 2.29%, while it had the twentieth-highest percentage of Brazilians, at 1.60% of all residents (tied with four other US areas.) Ojus's Israeli community had the seventeenth-highest percentage of residents, which was at 1.70% (tied with Sunny Isles Beach.) It is also home to the 113th-highest percentage of Dominican residents in the US, at 1.42% of the population, while its Romanian community was the twenty-first-highest percentage in the US, and accounted for 1.0% of all residents (tied with Davison, Michigan, Thompson, Ohio and Viola, N.Y.)

Education
Miami-Dade County Public Schools operates public schools. Ojus Elementary School is in Ojus. Students are zoned to Krop High School.

The Roman Catholic Archdiocese of Miami operates Catholic schools. St. Lawrence K-8 School is in Ojus.

Samuel Scheck Hillel Community Day School is in Ojus.

References

External links
Ojus Elementary School

Census-designated places in Miami-Dade County, Florida
Unincorporated communities in Miami-Dade County, Florida
Census-designated places in Florida
Unincorporated communities in Florida
Former municipalities in Florida